Altin Zeqiri (born 18 July 2000) is a Kosovan professional footballer who plays as a right winger for Finnish club Lahti.

Club career

Lahti
On 23 July 2019, Zeqiri signed a two-year contract with Veikkausliiga club Lahti and received squad number 24. Eighteen days later, he made his debut in a 4–0 away defeat against HJK after coming on as a substitute at 85th minute in place of Josu.

International career
On 15 March 2021, Zeqiri received a call-up from Kosovo U21 for the friendly matches against Qatar U23. Eleven days later, he made his debut with Kosovo U21 in first match against Qatar U23 after being named in the starting line-up.

References

External links

2000 births
Living people
Sportspeople from Espoo
Association football wingers
Kosovan footballers
Kosovo under-21 international footballers
Finnish footballers
Finnish people of Kosovan descent
Finnish people of Albanian descent
Kakkonen players
FC Espoo players
Veikkausliiga players
FC Lahti players